Lorene Bethell is an American politician who served for seven months as a member of the Kansas House of Representatives. She was picked by Republican Party precinct committee members in the 113th District to succeed her husband, Bob Bethell, who died on May 20 in a car accident.  She was sworn in on June 1, 2012, following her formal appointment by Gov. Sam Brownback.  She did not seek election to a full term in 2012 and left office in January 2013. Representative Bethell was not appointed to any committees during her tenure in the House of Representatives and attended only one House session during her term, the final session of the 2012 legislative session, which handled primarily ceremonial business.

References

Living people
Republican Party members of the Kansas House of Representatives
21st-century American politicians
21st-century American women politicians
Women state legislators in Kansas
Spouses of Kansas politicians
People from Rice County, Kansas
Year of birth missing (living people)